Meryame Kitir (born 20 April 1980) is a Belgian politician of the Forward party who served as the Minister of Development Cooperation and Urban Policy in the De Croo Government from October 2020 until December 2022, although the last two months she was out on sick leave. She has also been serving on the Genk municipal council since 2019, and previously sat on the Maasmechelen municipal council from 2006 to 2016.

Political career 
Kitir has been a member of the Chamber of Representatives since June 2007. In 2015, she became leader of her party's parliamentary group. She is known for her fiery manner in addressing issues, commonly having to do with the specific problems faced by the vast labour force of the Limburg province she represents.

Other activities
 African Development Bank (AfDB), Ex-Officio Member of the Board of Governors (2020–2022)
 Asian Development Bank (ADB), Ex-Officio Alternate Member of the Board of Governors (2020–2022)
 Inter-American Development Bank (IDB), Ex-Officio Alternate Member of the Board of Governors (2020–2022)
 European Bank for Reconstruction and Development (EBRD), Ex-Officio Alternate Member of the Board of Governors (2020–2022)
 World Bank, Ex-Officio Alternate Member of the Board of Governors (2020–2022)

References 

1980 births
Living people
Members of the Belgian Federal Parliament
Government ministers of Belgium
Socialistische Partij Anders politicians
21st-century Belgian politicians
21st-century Belgian women politicians
People from Maasmechelen
Women government ministers of Belgium